Ovid is an unincorporated community in Bear Lake County, Idaho.  It was first settled in 1864.

References

Unincorporated communities in Idaho
Unincorporated communities in Bear Lake County, Idaho
Populated places established in 1864